Australoschendyla is a genus of centipedes in the family Schendylidae. It was described by R. E. Jones in 1996. Centipedes in this genus range from 1 cm to 2 cm in length, have 41 to 47 pairs of legs, and are found in west Australia.

Species
There are two valid species:
 Australoschendyla albanyensis Jones, 1996
 Australoschendyla capensis Jones, 1996

References

 

 
 
Centipede genera
Centipedes of Australia
Endemic fauna of Australia
Animals described in 1996